Motor torpedo boat PT-658 is a PT-625-class Higgins  PT boat, built for the United States Navy during World War II. PT-658 is a prime example of US Navy motor torpedo boat development during World War II. PT-658 was in the last group of four boats delivered from the 36-boat contract NObs-1680, October 1944 for PT-625 to PT-660. Delivered and accepted on July 31, 1945, she was fitted with all of the latest armaments and design modifications as a result of lessons learned from previous contracts and battlefield experience. In this way, PT-658 is a showcase of the final form that motor torpedo boats would take by the end of World War II. PT-658 was listed on the National Register of Historic Places on September 4, 2012. Of three PT boats listed on the National Register, she is one of 2 maintained in operating condition.

Service history
PT-658 was one of a group of PT boats assigned to Motor Torpedo Boat Squadron 45 in April 1945, for transfer to the USSR under Lend-Lease. By the time she was completed on July 30, 1945, this transfer had been cancelled. PT-658 was transported to Bremerton, Washington on the deck of LST-375 from New Orleans along with PT-657, PT-659, and PT-660, arriving on September 25, 1945. PT-658 was then stationed at Port Hueneme, California, where on August 27, 1946, she was reclassified as a Small Boat, renumbered C105343, and served as a missile range patrol boat.  On December 3, 1948, she was reclassified as Floating Equipment.  PT-658 was then transferred to Naval Air Station Point Mugu, reclassified as RCT-13, and used to patrol the Point Mugu missile test range for watercraft straying into the missile landing area, and for towing targets. Also during this period, PT-658 served twice a week as a high speed transport, carrying men and supplies to the United States Air Force D.E.W. Radar Station on Santa Rosa Island, off the coast of Los Angeles in the Channel Island Group. PT-658s survival has been attributed to her completion late in the war, and that she was never sent overseas.

On June 30, 1958, PT-658 was sold to a private individual in the Oakland and Alameda, California area and renamed Porpoise. The private owner changed very little of her structure during the time he owned her. In 1993, she was donated by the late owner's estate to the veterans of Save the PT Boat, Inc. of Portland, Oregon. PT-658 was transported from Alameda to Portland in May 1994 by the 144th Transportation Unit of the Washington National Guard on the deck of the U.S. Army Logistics Support Vessel .

Restoration

A dedicated group of PT boat veterans formed the organization Save the PT Boat, Inc., a 501(c)(3) non-profit organization. The group restored PT-658 to her original 1945 configuration between 1995 and 2005. PT-658 is now fully functional and afloat, one of only two restored U.S. Navy PT boats that are operational today.

(The second, PT-305, was the beneficiary of some leftover parts collected by the PT-658 restoration team.)

PT-658s restoration includes (non-functional replicas of) a full armament of four Mark 13 torpedoes, two twin .50 caliber Browning M2 machine guns, a 40 mm Bofors cannon, two 20 mm Oerlikon cannon, two eight-cell Mark 50 Spin Stabilized 5 inch rocket launchers, two Mark 6  TNT depth charges, and a 60 m M2 mortar. She has three working  Packard 5M-2500 V12 gasoline engines.

PT-658 Heritage Museum is located in Portland, Oregon at the Swan Island Industrial Park. She is moored to Pier 307 of Vigor Industrial Shipyard as of October, 2013. Visitor access is provided via the marked Gate 18 at 5555 N. Lagoon Avenue.  The PT-658 Heritage Museum is open to the public every Monday, Thursday and Saturday 9am to 4pm for visitors. She has been moved into the new boathouse and the group continues to raise money for ongoing projects such as deck replacement, charthouse repair, and bottom replacement.  Money is also being raised for final boathouse improvements and to build a PT-658 Heritage and Education Center. In May 2010, replacement of the deck was completed in time for various summer festivals and shows.

Funding raised for additional restoration work included a $14,000 grant from the Oregon Cultural Trust, awarded in July 2010.

When originally launched in 1945, PT-658 wore a camouflage paint scheme, (specifically, Camouflage Measure 31, Design 20L) and this was restored in early 2011. In July 2011, two Mark 50 eight-cell rocket launcher mounts were added to the port and starboard bow. In May 2012, an original SOA radar mast (obtained on loan from PT Boats Inc. of Germantown, Tennessee) was installed along with an appropriately sized radar dome, signal generator and waveguide. Simultaneously, the 40mm Bofors cannon mount was improved with the addition of an ammunition clip holder/loader handrail to the rear of the mount, along with adjustable seats and authentic aerial spider type gunsights. Further equipment additions added by the crew in 2014 include authentic IFF dipole antennae on the chart house and radar mast, and a US M2 60mm mortar on the starboard side of the bow.

See also
  List of museum ships

Notes

References

External links

 
 

1945 ships
National Register of Historic Places in Portland, Oregon
658
Ships on the National Register of Historic Places in Oregon
Overlook, Portland, Oregon
World War II on the National Register of Historic Places
Museum ships in Oregon